The von Wartburg line (or Nantes-Épinal line) is the name commonly given to a language border highlighted by Walther von Wartburg in his 1939 study, Die Entstehung der romanischen Völker (The origins of the Romance peoples). This line enables a distinction between the northern and southern varieties of Gallo-Romance languages in the 9th century. It was identified for the first time by Jakob Jud.

According to Walther von Wartburg, this linguistic border is the result of Frankish settlement "north of the Loire River" and corresponds to the political and ethnic border that took form around the year 500 between the Frankish kingdom of Neustria in the north, and Aquitaine and Burgundy in the south. For other linguists, the Vulgar Latin spoken in northern Gaul was already different before the Franks' arrival.

With time, this line moved south until becoming the current border of Oïl languages, and Occitan and Franco-Provençal.

Geographical distribution 
The von Wartburg starts from the mouth of the Loire, follows the river until the Sologne, before following the Loire again around Cosne-Cours-sur-Loire. From there, it continues north of the Morvan, leaving to the south a significant part of Burgundy and all of Franche-Comté before reaching the south of the Vosges.

Further reading 

 Walther von Wartburg, Die Entstehung der romanischen Völker, Max Niemeyer Verlag, 1939
 Jean-René Trochet, Aux origines de la France rurale : outils, pays et paysages, CNRS éditions, Paris, 1993

See also 

 Gallo-Romance languages
 Langues d'oïl
 Franco-Provençal

References 

Occitan language
Oïl languages
History of the French language
Isoglosses